PlanetLove was an annual Northern Irish electronic music festival which was held since 1998 - with a skipped year in 2004. Held at Shane's Castle near Randalstown in County Antrim, it was previously held at Nutts Corner (also in Antrim), Kings Hall and Boucher Road Playing Fields in Belfast and near Cookstown in County Tyrone.

History
The festival was pioneered by BBMagazine's Judith Farell-Rowan and Eddie Wray. BBM Closed in 2004 to concentrate on the music festival and parent company, PLM Promotions.

Notably, the festival has been headlined or co-headlined by Paul van Dyk in every year except 2005, 2008 and 2021. The festival has been at least partially broadcast on BBC Radio 1 between 2006–2008.

It held its 10th-anniversary festival on the weekend of 5–6 September 2008, with headliners including Tiësto, Ferry Corsten, Rank 1, Pendulum, and many more with nine stages, the biggest yet. Camping was also available, along with the 2010 festival have been the only two to span across two days.

An Irish version of the festival, "PlanetLove Summer Session", was held on the same day as the 2007 Northern festival, this was in association with RTÉ 2fm and broadcast on this and the digital-only RTÉ 2XM; and was held again on a separate date in 2008, again broadcast on 2fm and the newly launched RTÉ Pulse.

The branding has also extended to winter-time arena events and club nights on the island of Ireland.

Following the recession of 2010/11 and a decline in the popularity of dance music, Planet Love promoter and owner Eddie Wray ceased to trade in 2011. 

Notorious Brands returned with the Planetlove festival in 2021, being held at Boucher Road Playing Fields, Belfast. Due to Covid-19 restrictions, the festival had to be fully open-air with four stages facing away from each other. In 2022 the festival will again take place at Boucher Road Playing Fields in Belfast with the following stages: LOVE, GoodGreef Xtra Hard, Subculture, YOYO, Met Arena, and VIP. This will be the first festival under Big-Top tents since 2011 (11 years).

Festival List
 Planetlove 98 (Banks of Lough Neagh)
 Planetlove 99 (Nutt's Corner)
 Planetlove 2000 (Nutt's Corner)
 Planetlove 2001 (Nutt's Corner)
 Planetlove 2002 (Shane's Castle)
 Planetlove 2003 (Shane's Castle)
 Planetlove 2005 (Shane's Castle)
 Planetlove 2006 (Shane's Castle)
 Planetlove 2007 (Shane's Castle)
 Planetlove 2008 (10 Year Celebrations and  2 Day Event) (Shane's Castle)
 Planetlove 2009 (Shane's Castle)
 Planetlove 2010 (2 Day Event) (King's Hall)
 Planetlove 2011 (Shane's Castle)
 Planetlove 2021 (Boucher Road Playing Fields)
 Planetlove 2022 (Sept 10, 2022) (Boucher Road Playing Fields)

See also
List of electronic music festivals

References

External links
PlanetLove
PlanetLove on Radio 1

Music festivals established in 1998
Electronic music festivals in the United Kingdom
Music festivals in Northern Ireland
Electronic music festivals in Ireland